The Nissan Magnite is a subcompact crossover SUV manufactured and marketed by Nissan. Unveiled in October 2020, the Magnite is placed below the Kicks in Nissan's global SUV lineup, making it the smallest Nissan crossover SUV worldwide.

The vehicle is exported to several right-hand drive emerging markets worldwide, consisting of Indonesia, South Africa, Nepal, Bhutan, Bangladesh, Sri Lanka, Brunei, Uganda, Kenya, Seychelles, Mozambique, Zambia, Mauritius, Tanzania, and Malawi.

The name "Magnite" is a portmanteau of the words "magnetic" and "ignite".

Overview

Pre-production 
In its development phase, the Magnite was planned as a flagship SUV for the Datsun marque. However, as the Datsun marque was slated to be discontinued, the Magnite was handed to the Nissan brand in the final phases of its development. The name "Datsun Magnite" has been trademarked in India since April 2019, followed by the name "Nissan Magnite" in March 2020. The vehicle was previewed for the first time in February 2020 in a side view silhouette form. The concept version was revealed virtually on 17 July 2020 as the Magnite Concept.

Production model 
The production model was revealed on 21 October 2020, and production started on 30 October 2020. It was launched in India on 2 December 2020, followed by Indonesia on 21 December.

The vehicle is built on an extended version of the CMF-A platform called the CMF-A+ platform. The platform also underpins the Renault Triber and Kiger.

Safety 

Southeast Asia

India

Sales

References

External links 

  (India)

Magnite
Cars introduced in 2020
Mini sport utility vehicles
Crossover sport utility vehicles
Front-wheel-drive vehicles
ASEAN NCAP small family cars
Global NCAP small family cars
Vehicles with CVT transmission